Dies Irae (Day of Wrath) is a live album by French rock band Noir Désir, recorded during the tour in support of the album Tostaky and released in 1994. Aside from the band's own originals, the album features two covers: 
 "I Want You (She's So Heavy)" (The Beatles)
 "Long Time Man" (Tim Rose)

The name of the album was selected by the band's guitarist Serge Teyssot-Gay who, while using a dictionary, found Dies Irae, and because of its similarity to a Noir Désir anagram and the translation,  Day of Wrath, he felt the expression suited the band well.

An alternate version of I Want You (She's So Heavy) is featured as a hidden track.

Track listing

Disc 1

Disc 2

Charts

References 

Noir Désir albums
1994 live albums
Barclay (record label) live albums